Robynne Tweedale (born 5 March 1996) is a British ice dancer. With her skating partner, Joseph Buckland, she is a three-time British national medalist, having won two silvers and one bronze. They have competed together on the Grand Prix series and at the European Championships.

Personal life 

Robynne Tweedale was born on 5 March 1996 in London, England. She is the daughter of Justine and Christopher Tweedale.

Career

Early years 
Tweedale started learning to skate in 2007. In 2012, she teamed up with Steven Adcock to compete in junior pair skating. The two took gold at the British Championships in November 2012 and competed at the ISU Junior Grand Prix in Slovakia in September 2013. They were coached by Daniel Thomas in Chelmsford, England.

2014–2015 season 
In 2014, Tweedale switched to ice dancing, teaming up with Edward Carstairs. They won the junior silver medal at the British Championships in November 2014. In March, they competed at the 2015 World Junior Championships in Tallinn, Estonia; ranked 26th in the short dance, they did not advance to the final segment. The two were coached by Philip Askew, Neil Chilcott, and Andrew Smykowski.

2016–2017 season: Debut of Tweedale/Buckland 
In 2016, Tweedale teamed up with Joseph Buckland. The two made their first international appearance in November, placing 15th at the 2016 CS Tallinn Trophy. Ranked 21st in the short dance, they just missed qualifying for the final segment at the 2017 European Championships, which took place in January in Ostrava, Czech Republic. Coached by Igor Shpilband, they trained in Novi, Michigan, United States, and in Nottingham, England.

2017–2018 season 
Tweedale/Buckland placed 7th at the 2017 CS Warsaw Cup and 12th at the 2017 CS Golden Spin of Zagreb. In December 2017, they took bronze at the British Championships, finishing third behind Penny Coomes / Nicholas Buckland and Lilah Fear / Lewis Gibson.

2018–2019 season 
Making their Grand Prix debut, Tweedale/Buckland finished ninth at the 2018 Skate America and then seventh at the 2018 Skate Canada International.  They also competed at three Challenger events for the season, and won the silver medal at the British championships.  They concluded the season at the 2019 European Championships, where they placed seventeenth.

2019–2020 season 
After placing tenth at the 2019 CS Lombardia Trophy, Tweedale/Buckland competed at a number of other minor internationals, missing the British Championships for the season.  They concluded at the 2020 European Championships, where they placed twenty-first.

Programs

With Buckland

With Carstairs

With Adcock

Competitive highlights 
GP: Grand Prix; CS: Challenger Series; JGP: Junior Grand Prix

Ice dancing with Buckland

Ice dancing with Carstairs

Pairs with Adcock

References

External links 
 

1996 births
English female ice dancers
Living people
Sportspeople from London